This article depicts many of the strongest chess tournaments in history.

The following list is not intended to be an exhaustive or definitive record of tournament chess, but takes as its foundation the collective opinion of chess experts and journalists over the strongest tournaments in history.

Events that merit inclusion have been largely judged according to the strength (and relative strength in depth) of their participants. Other factors were taken into account, but have less influence; for example the quality of chess played, the closeness of the contest and the number of world top 10 and/or 'big reputation' players who took part, the time control (no fast chess tournaments are listed). Inevitably, this introduces a degree of subjectivity, but the vast majority of tournaments in the list range from FIDE Category 10 to FIDE category 21 and beyond.

The names of the tournament winners have been included next to the year and venue. Many of the tournaments have had books written about them and whilst these will be mostly out of print, they are occasionally available at online auction sites, second-hand specialist book shops etc.

No attempt is made at comparing the relative strengths of tournaments in the list, as this is, and continues to be, the subject of inconclusive debate amongst experts.

While events are listed in year order, they are not listed chronologically within the same year.

Tournaments and winners

1850–1859
 1851 London Anderssen
 1851 London (London Club) Anderssen
 1857 Manchester Löwenthal
 1857 New York (American Chess Congress) Morphy
 1858 Birmingham Löwenthal

1860–1869
 1861 Bristol Paulsen
 1862 London Anderssen
 1865 Dublin Steinitz
 1867 Paris Kolisch
 1867 Dundee Neumann
 1868 Aachen (WDSB Congress) Lange
 1869 Hamburg (NDSB Congress) Anderssen
 1869 Barmen (WDSB Congress) Anderssen

1870–1879
 1870 Baden-Baden Anderssen
 1871 Krefeld (WDSB Congress) Paulsen
 1872 Altona (NDSB Congress) Anderssen
 1872 London Steinitz
 1873 Vienna Steinitz 
 1874 Chicago (American Chess Congress) Mackenzie
 1876 New York Mackenzie
 1876 Philadelphia (American Chess Congress) Mason
 1876 New York (Clipper) Mason
 1876 Leipzig (MDSB Congress) Anderssen
 1876 London Blackburne
 1877 Leipzig (MDSB Congress) Paulsen
 1878 Paris Zukertort
 1878 Frankfurt (WDSB Congress) Paulsen
 1879 London Bird
 1879 Leipzig (DSB Congress) Englisch

1880–1889
 1880 Wiesbaden Blackburne, Englisch, Schwarz
 1880 Braunschweig (WDSB Congress) Paulsen
 1881 Berlin (DSB Congress) Blackburne
 1882 Vienna Steinitz, Winawer
 1883 London Zukertort
 1883 Nuremberg (DSB Congress) Winawer
 1885 Hamburg (DSB Congress) Gunsberg
 1885 Hereford Blackburne
 1886 London Blackburne
 1886 London (BCA Congress) Blackburne
 1886 Belfast Pollock
 1886 Nottingham Burn
 1887 Frankfurt (DSB Congress) Mackenzie
 1887 London Burn, Gunsberg
 1888 Leipzig von Bardeleben, Riemann
 1888 Bradford Gunsberg
 1889 Amsterdam Burn
 1889 New York (American Chess Congress) Weiss, Chigorin
 1889 Breslau (DSB Congress) Tarrasch

1890–1899

 1890 Manchester Tarrasch
 1890 Vienna Weiss
 1890 Graz Makovetz
 1890 Berlin Lasker, Lasker B.
 1891 Berlin Caro
 1892 Dresden (DSB Congress) Tarrasch
 1892 London Lasker
 1893 New York Lasker
 1894 Leipzig (DSB Congress) Tarrasch
 1894 New York Steinitz
 1895 Hastings Pillsbury
 1895/96 St Petersburg Lasker 
 1896 Budapest Chigorin
 1896 Nuremberg Lasker
 1897 Berlin (Schachverein Centrum) von Bardeleben
 1897 Berlin Charousek
 1898 Budapest Charousek
 1898 Cologne (DSB Congress) Burn
 1898 Vienna Tarrasch
 1899 London Lasker
 1899/1900 Vienna Maróczy

1900–1909

 1900 Paris Lasker
 1900 Munich (DSB Congress) Pillsbury, Schlechter
 1901 Monte Carlo Janowski
 1901 Moscow (Russian Championship) Chigorin
 1902 Vienna Janowski, Wolf
 1902 Monte Carlo Maroczy
 1902 Hannover (DSB Congress) Janowski
 1903 Monte Carlo Tarrasch
 1904 Cambridge Springs Marshall
 1904 Monte Carlo Maroczy
 1904 Coburg (DSB Congress) von Bardeleben, Schlechter, Swiderski
 1905 Ostend Maroczy
 1905 Barmen Janowski, Maroczy
 1906 Ostend Schlechter
 1906 Stockholm Bernstein, Schlechter
 1906 Nuremberg (DSB Congress) Marshall
 1906 St Petersburg (Russian Championship) Salwe
 1907 Vienna Mieses
 1907 Ostend Tarrasch
 1907 Carlsbad Rubinstein
 1908 Vienna Maroczy, Schlechter, Duras
 1908 Prague Duras, Schlechter
 1909 St. Petersburg Lasker, Rubinstein

1910–1919
 1910 Hamburg (DSB Congress) Schlechter
 1910/11 Vienna Schlechter
 1911 New York Marshall
 1911 San Sebastián Capablanca
 1911 Carlsbad Teichmann
 1912 San Sebastián Rubinstein
 1912 Bad Pistyan Rubinstein
 1912 Budapest Marshall, Schlechter
 1912 Vilnius (Russian Championship) Rubinstein
 1912 Breslau (DSB Congress) Rubinstein, Duras
 1913 New York Capablanca
 1913 Havana Marshall
 1913 Vienna Schlechter
 1913 Vienna (Vienna Club) Spielmann
 1914 St Petersburg (Russian Championship) Alekhine, Nimzowitsch
 1914 St. Petersburg Lasker 
 1914 Baden bei Wien Spielmann
 1914 Mannheim (DSB Congress) Alekhine
 1914 Vienna Schlechter
 1915 New York Capablanca
 1916/17 Vienna Schlechter
 1917/18 Vienna Vidmar
 1918 Berlin Lasker
 1918 Berlin (Four Masters) Vidmar
 1918 Kaschau Réti
 1918 New York Capablanca
 1919 Stockholm Spielmann
 1919 Hastings Capablanca

1920–1929
 1920 Amsterdam Réti
 1920 Göteborg Réti
 1920 Berlin Breyer
 1921 Kiel Bogoljubov
 1921 Triberg Alekhine
 1921 Budapest Alekhine
 1921 The Hague Alekhine
 1921 Triberg (2) Rubinstein
 1922 Bad Pistyan Bogoljubov
 1922 London Capablanca
 1922 Vienna Rubinstein
 1922 Teplitz-Schönau Reti, Spielmann
 1922 Hastings Alekhine
 1922/23 Hastings Rubinstein
 1923 Margate Grünfeld
 1923 Carlsbad Alekhine, Bogoljubov, Maroczy
 1923 Vienna Tartakower
 1923 Moravska Ostrava Lasker 
 1923 Copenhagen Nimzowitsch
 1924 New York Lasker 
 1924 Meran Grünfeld
 1924 Moscow (USSR Championship) Bogoljubov
 1924/25 Hastings Maroczy, Tartakower
 1925 Debrecen Kmoch
 1925 Baden-Baden Alekhine
 1925 Paris Alekhine
 1925 Breslau (DSB Congress) Bogoljubov
 1925 Marienbad Rubinstein, Nimzowitsch
 1925 Moscow Bogoljubov
 1925 Leningrad (USSR Championship) Bogoljubov
 1925/26 Hastings Alekhine, Vidmar
 1926 Hannover Nimzowitsch
 1926 Budapest Grünfeld, Monticelli
 1926 Semmering Spielmann
 1926 Lake Hopatcong Capablanca
 1926 Chicago Marshall
 1926 Dresden Nimzowitsch
 1926 Berlin Bogoljubov
 1927 London Nimzowitsch, Tartakower
 1927 Kecskemét  Alekhine
1927  Bad Homburg Bogoljubov
 1927 Magdeburg (DSB Congress) Spielmann
 1927 New York Capablanca
 1928 Budapest Capablanca
 1928 Vienna Réti
 1928 Dortmund Sämisch
 1928 Bad Kissingen Bogoljubov
 1928 Berlin Capablanca
 1928 Berlin (BSG) Nimzowitsch
 1929 Carlsbad Nimzowitsch
 1929 Bradley Beach Alekhine
 1929 Budapest Capablanca
 1929 Barcelona Capablanca
 1929 Rogaska Slatina Rubinstein
 1929/30 Hastings Capablanca

1930–1939
 1930 Frankfurt Nimzowitsch
 1930 Stockholm Kashdan
 1930 San Remo  Alekhine
 1930 Scarborough Colle
 1930 Amsterdam Weenink
 1930 Liege Tartakower
 1930/31 Hastings Euwe
 1931 New York Capablanca
 1931 Rotterdam Landau
 1931 Bled Alekhine
 1931/32 Hastings Flohr
 1932 Bad Sliac Flohr, Vidmar
 1932 London Alekhine
 1932 Pasadena Alekhine
 1932 Bern Alekhine
 1932 Mexico City Alekhine, Kashdan
 1932/33 Hastings Flohr
 1933 Paris Alekhine
 1933 Scheveningen Flohr
 1933/34 Hastings Flohr
 1934 Syracuse Reshevsky
 1934 Zurich Alekhine
 1934 Ujpest Lilienthal
 1934 Leningrad Botvinnik
 1934/35 Hastings Euwe, Flohr, Thomas
 1935 Moscow Botvinnik, Flohr
 1935 Margate Reshevsky
 1935/36 Hastings Fine
 1936 Margate Flohr
 1936 New York (USA Championship) Reshevsky
 1936 Bad Nauheim Alekhine, Keres
 1936 Zandvoort Fine
 1936 Amsterdam Euwe, Fine
 1936 Dresden Alekhine
 1936 Moscow Capablanca
 1936 Nottingham Botvinnik, Capablanca
 1936 Podebrady Flohr
 1936/37 Hastings Alekhine
 1937 Kemeri Flohr, Petrovs, Reshevsky
 1937 Pärnu Schmidt
 1937 Margate Fine, Keres
 1937 Ostend Fine, Grob, Keres
 1937 Bad Nauheim/Stuttgart/Garmisch Euwe
 1937 Semmering/Baden Keres
 1937 Moscow Fine
 1937/38 Hastings Reshevsky
 1938 Noordwijk Eliskases
 1938 New York (USA Championship) Reshevsky
 1938 AVRO Tournament (Netherlands) Keres, Fine
 1938/39 Hastings Szabó
 1939 Amsterdam Euwe, Szabo, Flohr
 1939 Amsterdam (VARA) Euwe, Landau
 1939 Leningrad – Moscow Flohr
 1939 New York (USA Open) Fine
 1939 Margate Keres
 1939 Stuttgart Bogoljubov
 1939 Bournemouth Euwe
 1939 Leningrad (USSR Championship) Botvinnik

1940–1949
 1940 New York (USA Championship) Reshevsky
 1940 Moscow (USSR Championship) Lilienthal, Bondarevsky
 1941 Leningrad/Moscow (USSR Absolute Championship) Botvinnik
 1941 Mar del Plata Ståhlberg
 1941  Munich Stoltz
 1941 Kraków/Warsaw (General Government chess tournament) Alekhine, Schmidt
 1942  Mar del Plata Najdorf
 1942  Salzburg Alekhine
 1942  Munich (European Championship) Alekhine
 1942 Prague Alekhine, Junge
 1943 Mar del Plata Najdorf
 1943 Sverdlovsk Botvinnik
 1943 Prague Alekhine
 1943 Salzburg Keres, Alekhine
 1944 Mar del Plata Pilnik, Najdorf
 1944 La Plata Najdorf
 1944 Moscow (USSR Championship) Botvinnik
 1945 Hollywood Reshevsky
 1945 Mar del Plata Najdorf
 1945 Buenos Aires Najdorf
 1945 Moscow (USSR Championship) Botvinnik
 1946 Mar del Plata Najdorf
 1946 Groningen Botvinnik
 1947 Moscow Botvinnik
 1947 Pärnu Keres
 1947 Warsaw Gligorić
 1947 Mar del Plata Najdorf
 1947 Buenos Aires/La Plata Ståhlberg
 1947 Leningrad (USSR Championship) Keres
 1948 Mar del Plata Eliskases
 1948 Buenos Aires/La Plata Najdorf, Ståhlberg
 1948 Venice Najdorf
 1948 The Hague-Moscow (World Championship) Botvinnik
 1948 Saltsjöbaden (Interzonal Tournament) Bronstein
 1948 Moscow (USSR Championship) Bronstein, Kotov
 1948/49 New York Fine
 1949 Moscow (USSR Championship) Bronstein, Smyslov

1950–1959
 1950 Amsterdam Najdorf
 1950 Szczawno Zdrój Keres
 1950 Venice Kotov
 1950 Budapest (Candidates Tournament) Bronstein
 1950 Moscow (USSR Championship) Keres
 1951 New York Reshevsky
 1951 Birmingham Gligorić
 1951 Moscow (USSR Championship) Keres
 1952 Havana Reshevsky, Najdorf
 1952 Budapest Keres
 1952 Saltsjöbaden (Interzonal Tournament) Kotov
 1952 Moscow (USSR Championship) Botvinnik
 1953 Bucharest Tolush
 1953 Gagra Smyslov
 1953 Zurich (Candidates Tournament) Smyslov
 1954 Belgrade Bronstein
 1954 Kiev (USSR Championship) Averbakh
 1954/55 Hastings Keres, Smyslov
 1955 Mar del Plata Ivkov
 1955 Zagreb Smyslov
 1955 Gothenburg (Interzonal Tournament) Bronstein
 1955 Moscow (USSR Championship) Geller
 1955/56 Hastings Korchnoi
 1956 Moscow Botvinnik, Smyslov
 1956 Amsterdam (Candidates Tournament) Smyslov
 1956 Leningrad (USSR Championship) Taimanov
 1957 Moscow (USSR Championship) Tal
 1957/58 Hastings Keres
 1958 Riga (USSR Championship) Tal
 1958 Portorož (Interzonal Tournament), Tal
 1959 Moscow Bronstein, Smyslov, Spassky
 1959 Zurich Tal
 1959 Dresden Geller, Taimanov
 1959 Riga Spassky
 1959 Bled/Zagreb/Belgrade (Candidates Tournament) Tal
 1959 Tbilisi (USSR Championship) Petrosian

1960–1969
 1960 Mar del Plata Fischer, Spassky
 1960 Buenos Aires Korchnoi, Reshevsky
 1960 Santa Fe Szabo, Taimanov
 1960 Copenhagen Petrosian
 1960 Córdoba Korchnoi
 1960 Moscow Smyslov, Kholmov
 1960 Leningrad (USSR Championship) Korchnoi
 1961 Moscow (USSR Championship) Petrosian
 1961 Bled Tal
 1961 Zurich Keres
 1961 Dortmund Taimanov
 1961 Budapest Korchnoi
 1961 Baku (USSR Championship) Spassky
 1961/62 Hastings Botvinnik
 1962 Havana Najdorf
 1962 Stockholm (Interzonal Tournament) Fischer
 1962 Willemstad (Candidates Tournament) Petrosian
 1962 Yerevan (USSR Championship) Korchnoi
 1963 Los Angeles (Piatigorsky Cup) Keres, Petrosian
 1963 Havana Korchnoi
 1963 Moscow Smyslov
 1963 Sochi Polugaevsky
 1963 Leningrad (USSR Championship) Stein
 1964 Belgrade Spassky
 1964 Buenos Aires Keres, Petrosian
 1964 Moscow (Zonal Tournament) Spassky
 1964 Amsterdam (Interzonal Tournament) Smyslov, Larsen, Spassky, Tal
 1964/65 Kiev (USSR Championship) Korchnoi
 1965 Yerevan Korchnoi
 1965 Havana Smyslov
 1965 Santiago Smyslov
 1965 Zagreb Ivkov, Uhlmann
 1965 Tallinn (USSR Championship) Stein
 1966 Santa Monica (Piatigorsky Cup) Spassky
 1966 Mar del Plata Smyslov
 1966 Moscow Petrosian
 1966 Sochi Korchnoi
 1966 Kislovodsk Geller
 1966/67 Tbilisi (USSR Championship) Stein
 1967 Beverwijk Spassky
 1967 Monte Carlo Fischer
 1967 Havana Larsen
 1967 Winnipeg Larsen, Darga
 1967 Venice Donner
 1967 Moscow Stein
 1967 Palma de Mallorca Larsen
 1967 Skopje Fischer
 1967 Sousse (Interzonal Tournament) Larsen
 1967 Kharkov (USSR Championship) Tal, Polugaevsky
 1968 Wijk aan Zee Korchnoi
 1968 Monte Carlo Larsen
 1968 Bamberg Keres
 1968 Skopje/Ohrid Portisch
 1968 Gori Tal
 1968 Palma de Mallorca Korchnoi
 1968/69 Alma-Ata (USSR Championship) Polugaevsky
 1969 Wijk aan Zee Botvinnik, Geller
 1969 Buesum Larsen
 1969 San Juan Spassky
 1969 Palma de Mallorca Larsen
 1969 Belgrade Polugaevsky, Ivkov, Gligoric, Matulovic
 1969 Moscow (USSR Championship) Petrosian
 1969/70 Hastings Portisch

1970–1979
 1970 Amsterdam Spassky, Polugaevsky
 1970 Rovinj/Zagreb Fischer
 1970 Buenos Aires Fischer
 1970 Leiden Spassky
 1970 Vinkovci Larsen
 1970 Palma de Mallorca (Interzonal Tournament) Fischer
 1970 Riga (USSR Championship) Korchnoi
 1971 Wijk aan Zee Korchnoi
 1971 Pärnu Stein
 1971 Moscow Karpov, Stein
 1971 Tallinn Keres, Tal
 1971 Amsterdam Smyslov
 1971 Palma de Mallorca Panno, Ljubojević
 1971 Leningrad (USSR Championship) Savon
 1971/72 Hastings Karpov, Korchnoi
 1972 Wijk aan Zee Portisch
 1972 Amsterdam Polugaevsky
 1972 Teesside Larsen
 1972 Kislovodsk Polugaevsky
 1972 Las Palmas Portisch
 1972 Sarajevo Szabo
 1972 San Antonio Portisch, Petrosian, Karpov
 1972 Palma de Mallorca Panno, Korchnoi, Smejkal
 1972 Baku (USSR Championship) Tal
 1973 Amsterdam Petrosian, Planinc
 1973 Tallinn Tal
 1973 Sochi Tal
 1973 Dortmund Spassky, Hecht, Andersson
 1973 Las Palmas Petrosian, Stein
 1973 Madrid Karpov
 1973 Leningrad (Interzonal Tournament) Korchnoi, Karpov
 1973 Petropolis (Interzonal Tournament) Mecking
 1973 Moscow (USSR Championship) Spassky
 1974 Manila Vasiukov
 1974 Las Palmas Ljubojević
 1974 Solingen Kavalek, Polugaevsky
 1974 Leningrad (USSR Championship) Tal, Beliavsky
 1975 Wijk aan Zee Portisch
 1975 Amsterdam Ljubojevic
 1975 Teesside Geller
 1975 Moscow Geller
 1975 Portorož – Ljubljana Karpov
 1975 Milan Karpov
 1975 Las Palmas Ljubojevic
 1975 Manila Ljubojević
 1975 Budapest Ribli, Polugaevsky
 1975 Yerevan (USSR Championship) Petrosian
 1976 Wijk aan Zee Ólafsson, Ljubojevic
 1976 Manila (Interzonal Tournament) Mecking
 1976 Manila Torre
 1976 Biel (Interzonal Tournament) Larsen
 1976 Skopje Karpov
 1976 Sochi Polugaevsky, Sveshnikov
 1976 Las Palmas Geller
 1976 Moscow (USSR Championship) Karpov
 1977 Leningrad Romanishin, Tal
 1977 Portorož – Ljubljana Larsen
 1977 Las Palmas Karpov
 1977 Tilburg Karpov
 1977 Sochi Tal
 1977 Leningrad (USSR Championship) Dorfman, Gulko
 1977/78 Hastings Dzindzichashvili
 1978 Wijk aan Zee Portisch
 1978 Lone Pine Larsen
 1978 Bugojno Karpov, Spassky
 1978 Reykjavik Browne
 1978 Niksic Gulko, Timman
 1978 Tilburg Portisch
 1978 Montilla/Moriles Spassky
 1978 Vilnius Tukmakov
 1978 Tbilisi (USSR Championship) Tal, Tseshkovsky
 1979 Montreal Karpov, Tal
 1979 Tilburg  Karpov
 1979 Waddinxveen Karpov
 1979 Wijk aan Zee Polugaevsky
 1979 Bled – Portorož Timman
 1979 Munich  Spassky, Balashov, Andersson, Hübner
 1979 Riga (Interzonal Tournament) Tal
 1979 Tallinn  Petrosian
 1979 Lone Pine Liberzon, Gheorghiu, Gligoric, Hort
 1979 Banja Luka Kasparov
 1979 Buenos Aires  Larsen
 1979 Rio de Janeiro (Interzonal Tournament) Portisch, Petrosian, Hübner
 1979 Minsk (USSR Championship) Geller

1980–1989
 1980 Wijk aan Zee Seirawan, Browne
 1980 Baden bei Wien Beliavsky, Spassky
 1980 Amsterdam Karpov
 1980 Lone Pine Dzindzichashvili
 1980 Bugojno Karpov
 1980 Bad Kissingen Karpov
 1980 Baku Kasparov
 1980 London (Phillips & Drew Kings) Miles, Korchnoi, Andersson
 1980 Tilburg  Karpov
 1980 Buenos Aires  Larsen
 1980/81 Vilnius (USSR Championship) Psakhis, Beliavsky
 1981 Amsterdam Timman
 1981 Lone Pine Korchnoi
 1981 Johannesburg Andersson
 1981 Las Palmas Timman
 1981 Linares Christiansen, Karpov
 1981 Moscow Karpov
 1981 Tilburg  Beliavsky
 1981 Moscow (USSR Championship) Kasparov, Psakhis
 1982 Bugojno Kasparov
 1982 London (Phillips & Drew Kings) Andersson, Karpov
 1982 Sochi Tal
 1982 Lugano Korchnoi
 1982 Wijk aan Zee Balashov, Nunn
 1982 Chicago Hübner
 1982 Mar del Plata Timman
 1982 Tilburg Karpov
 1982 Turin Andersson, Karpov
 1982 Las Palmas (Interzonal Tournament) Ribli
 1982 Moscow (Interzonal Tournament) Kasparov
 1982 Toluca (Interzonal Tournament) Portisch, Torre
 1983 Wijk aan Zee Andersson
 1983 Indonesia Timman
 1983 Tallinn  Tal, Vaganian
 1983 Linares Spassky
 1983 Niksic Kasparov
 1983 Tilburg  Karpov
 1983 Moscow (USSR Championship) Karpov
 1984 Lvov Vaganian, Dorfman
 1984 Oslo Karpov
 1984 Lugano Sax
 1984 Wijk aan Zee Beliavsky, Korchnoi
 1984 Bugojno Timman
 1984 London (Phillips & Drew Kings) Karpov
 1984 Sarajevo Korchnoi, Timman
 1984 Tilburg  Miles
 1984/85 Reggio Emilia Portisch
 1985 Amsterdam Karpov
 1985 Portorož – Ljubljana Portisch, Ribli, Miles
 1985 Linares Hübner, Ljubojevic
 1985 Lugano Tukmakov
 1985 Tilburg  Hübner, Korchnoi, Miles
 1985 Wijk aan Zee Timman
 1985 Moscow Romanishin
 1985 Zagreb Timman
 1985 Brussels Korchnoi
 1985 Naestved Vaganian, Larsen, Browne
 1985 Tunis (Interzonal Tournament) Yusupov
 1985 Taxco (Interzonal Tournament) Timman
 1985 Biel (Interzonal Tournament) Vaganian
 1985 Montpellier (Candidates Tournament) Yusupov, Vaganian, Sokolov
 1985/86 Reggio Emilia Andersson
 1986 Wijk aan Zee Short
 1986 Brussels Karpov
 1986 Brussels (OHRA) Kasparov
 1986 Bugojno Karpov
 1986 Vienna Korchnoi, Beliavsky
 1986 Lugano Korchnoi
 1986 Sochi Vaganian, Beliavsky, Gligoric
 1986 Amsterdam Ljubojevic
 1986 Tilburg  Beliavsky
 1986 Solingen  Hübner
 1986 Sarajevo Portisch, Psakhis, Georgiev
 1986 London (Phillips & Drew Kings) Flear
 1986/87 Reggio Emilia Ribli
 1987 Wijk aan Zee Korchnoi
 1987 Belgrade Ljubojevic
 1987 Bilbao Karpov
 1987 Sarajevo Nikolić
 1987 Leningrad Vaganian
 1987 Brussels Kasparov, Ljubojevic
 1987 Tilburg  Timman
 1987 Reykjavik Short
 1987 Amsterdam Karpov, Timman
 1987 Subotica (Interzonal Tournament) Sax, Short, Speelman
 1987 Szirak (Interzonal Tournament) Salov, Hjartarson
 1987 Zagreb (Interzonal Tournament) Korchnoi
 1987 Minsk (USSR Championship) Beliavsky
 1987/88 Reggio Emilia Tukmakov
 1988 Wijk aan Zee Karpov
 1988 Amsterdam (Optiebeurs) Kasparov
 1988 Amsterdam Short
 1988 Brussels (GMA World Cup) Karpov
 1988 Belfort (GMA World Cup) Kasparov
 1988 Reykjavik (GMA World Cup) Kasparov
 1988 Linares Timman
 1988 Tilburg Karpov
 1988 Moscow (USSR Championship) Kasparov, Karpov
 1988/89 Reggio Emilia Gurevich
 1988/89 Hastings Short
1989 Wijk aan Zee Viswanathan Anand, Predrag Nikolić, Zoltán Ribli, Gyula Sax
 1989 Amsterdam Timman
 1989 Amsterdam (OHRA) Beliavsky
 1989 Lugano Korchnoi, Petursson
 1989 Clermont-Ferrand Korchnoi, Renet, Dolmatov, Sax, Ehlvest
 1989 Barcelona (GMA World Cup)  Kasparov, Ljubojevic
 1989 Linares Ivanchuk
 1989 Rotterdam (GMA World Cup) Timman
 1989 Skelleftea (GMA World Cup) Karpov, Kasparov
 1989 Tilburg Kasparov
 1989 Belgrade Kasparov
 1989/90 Reggio Emilia Ehlvest

1990–1999
 1990 Wijk aan Zee Nunn
 1990 Linares Kasparov
 1990 Amsterdam Beliavsky
 1990 Haninge Seirawan
 1990 Rotterdam Korchnoi
 1990 Prague Timman
 1990 Tilburg Ivanchuk, Kamsky
 1990 Pamplona Korchnoi
 1990 Manila (Interzonal Tournament) Gelfand, Ivanchuk
 1990 Leningrad (USSR Championship) Beliavsky, Yudasin, Bareev, Vyzmanavin
 1990/91 Reggio Emilia Karpov
 1991 Wijk aan Zee Nunn
 1991 Amsterdam Salov, Short
 1991 Harlingen Korchnoi
 1991 Linares Ivanchuk
 1991 Munich Christiansen
 1991 Belgrade Gelfand
 1991 Reykjavik Ivanchuk, Karpov
 1991 Terrassa Adams, Ehlvest
 1991 Tilburg Kasparov
 1991 Bled/Rogaska Slatina Nikolic
 1991/92 Reggio Emilia Anand
 1992 Wijk aan Zee Gelfand, Salov
 1992 Biel Karpov
 1992 Amsterdam Short, Anand
 1992 Dortmund Ivanchuk, Kasparov
 1992 Linares Kasparov
 1992 Madrid Karpov
 1992 Moscow Anand, Gelfand
 1992 Tilburg Adams
 1992 Baden-Baden Karpov
 1993 Wijk aan Zee Karpov
 1993 Amsterdam Anand, Kramnik, Short
 1993 Dortmund Karpov
 1993 Linares Kasparov
 1993 Chalkidiki Gelfand
 1993 Las Palmas Morovic Fernandez
 1993 Munich Shirov
 1993 Madrid Anand, Kramnik, Topalov
 1993 Biel (FIDE Interzonal Tournament) Gelfand
 1993 Groningen (PCA Candidates Qualifier) Adams, Anand
 1993 Tilburg Karpov
 1994 Amsterdam Kasparov
 1994 Las Palmas Kamsky
 1994 Dortmund Piket
 1994 Horgen Kasparov
 1994 Linares Karpov
 1994 Munich Ivanchuk
 1994 Madrid Polgár
 1994 Dos Hermanas Gelfand
 1994 Novgorod Ivanchuk, Kasparov
 1994 Tilburg Salov
 1995 Wijk aan Zee Dreev
 1995 Dortmund Kramnik
 1995 Leon Shirov, Bareev
 1995 Madrid Korchnoi
 1995 Belgrade Kramnik, Gelfand
 1995 Dos Hermanas Adams, Kamsky, Karpov
 1995 Amsterdam Lautier
 1995 Amsterdam (Donner Memorial) Timman, Granda Zuniga
 1995 Linares Ivanchuk
 1995 Novgorod Kasparov
 1995 Riga Kasparov
 1995 Biel Dreev
 1995 Horgen Ivanchuk, Kramnik
 1995 Groningen Karpov
 1995 Elista (Russian Championship) Svidler
 1996 Wijk aan Zee Ivanchuk
 1996 Amsterdam Kasparov, Topalov
 1996 Dortmund Anand, Kramnik
 1996 Dos Hermanas Kramnik, Topalov
 1996 Las Palmas Kasparov
 1996 Amsterdam (Donner Memorial) Granda Zuniga, Ivanchuk
 1996 Groningen Short
 1996 Belgrade Bareev
 1996 Belgrade (Stara Pazova) Karpov
 1996 Leon Polgár, Topalov
 1996 Madrid Illescas Córdoba, Topalov
 1996 Novgorod Topalov
 1996 Vienna Gelfand, Karpov, Topalov
 1996 Elista (Russian Championship) Khalifman
 1996 Tilburg Piket, Gelfand
 1997 Wijk aan Zee Salov
 1997 Belgrade Anand, Ivanchuk
 1997 Biel Anand
 1997 Dortmund Kramnik
 1997 Dos Hermanas Anand, Kramnik
 1997 Linares Kasparov
 1997 Madrid Shirov, Topalov
 1997 Polanica Zdroj Rublevsky
 1997 Novgorod Kasparov
 1997 Tilburg Kasparov, Kramnik, Svidler
 1997 Elista (Russian Championship) Svidler
 1997 Groningen (FIDE Knockout Championship) Anand
 1998 Wijk aan Zee Anand, Kramnik
 1998 Dortmund Adams, Kramnik, Svidler
 1998 Linares Anand
 1998 Madrid Anand
 1998 Polanica Zdroj Gelfand
 1998 Elista Ivanchuk
 1998 Tilburg Anand
 1998 St Petersburg (Russian Championship) Morozevich
 1999 Wijk aan Zee Kasparov
 1999 Dortmund Leko
 1999 Dos Hermanas Adams
 1999 Linares Kasparov
 1999 Sarajevo Kasparov
 1999 Las Vegas (FIDE Knockout Championship) Khalifman

2000–2009
 2000 Wijk aan Zee Kasparov
 2000 Dortmund Anand, Kramnik
 2000 Linares Kasparov, Kramnik
 2000 Montecatini Terme Ivanchuk
 2000 Polanica Zdroj Gelfand
 2000 Shenyang (Chess World Cup) Anand
 2000 Sarajevo Kasparov
 2000 New Delhi/Tehran (FIDE Knockout Championship) Anand
 2001 Wijk aan Zee Kasparov
 2001 Astana Kasparov
 2001 Dortmund Kramnik, Topalov
 2001 Biel Korchnoi
 2001 Linares Kasparov
 2001/02 Moscow (FIDE Knockout Championship) Ponomariov
 2002 Cannes Gelfand, Topalov
 2002 Wijk aan Zee Bareev
 2002 Linares Kasparov
 2002 Dortmund (Candidates Tournament) Leko
 2002 Hyderabad (Chess World Cup) Anand
 2003 Wijk aan Zee Anand
 2003 Budapest Short
 2003 Dortmund Bologan
 2003 Enghien-les-Bains Bareev
 2003 Reykjavik Shirov
 2003 Linares Kramnik, Leko
 2003 Krasnoyarsk (Russian Championship) Svidler
 2004 Wijk aan Zee Anand
 2004 Dortmund Anand
 2004 Biel Morozevich
 2004 Linares Kramnik
 2004 Tripoli (FIDE Knockout Championship) Kasimdzhanov
 2004 Moscow (Russian Championship) Kasparov
 2005 Wijk aan Zee Leko
 2005 Dortmund Naiditsch
 2005 Linares Kasparov, Topalov
 2005 Sofia Topalov
 2005 Khanty-Mansiysk (Chess World Cup) Aronian
 2005 San Luis (FIDE World Championship) Topalov
 2005 Moscow (Russian Championship) Rublevsky
 2006 Wijk aan Zee Anand, Topalov
 2006 Dortmund Kramnik, Svidler
 2006 Biel Morozevich
 2006 Foros Rublevsky
 2006 Morelia/Linares Aronian
 2006 Moscow Aronian, Leko, Ponomariov
 2006 Sofia Topalov
 2007 Wijk aan Zee Aronian, Radjabov, Topalov
 2007 Morelia/Linares Anand
 2007 Sofia Topalov
 2007 Dortmund Kramnik
 2007 Foros Ivanchuk
 2007 Biel Carlsen
 2007 Khanty-Mansiysk (Chess World Cup) Kamsky
 2007 Moscow Kramnik
 2007 Mexico City (World Championship)  Anand
 2007 Moscow (Russian Championship) Morozevich
 2008 Wijk aan Zee Aronian, Carlsen
 2008 Morelia/Linares Anand
 2008 Baku (Grand Prix 2008–2010) Gashimov, Wang Yue, Carlsen
 2008 Sofia Ivanchuk
 2008 Foros Carlsen
 2008 Dortmund Leko
 2008 Yerevan Aronian
 2008 Sochi (Grand Prix 2008–2010) Aronian
 2008 Moscow Ivanchuk
 2008 Bilbao Topalov
 2008 Nanjing Topalov
 2008 Elista (Grand Prix 2008–2010) Radjabov, Jakovenko, Grischuk
 2008 Moscow (Russian Championship) Svidler
 2009 Wijk aan Zee Karjakin
 2009 Linares Grischuk, Ivanchuk
 2009 Nalchik (Grand Prix 2008–2010) Aronian
 2009 Sofia Shirov
 2009 Bazna Ivanchuk
 2009 Dortmund Kramnik
 2009 Biel Vachier-Lagrave
 2009 Jermuk (Grand Prix 2008–2010) Ivanchuk
 2009 Bilbao Aronian
 2009 Nanjing Carlsen
 2009 Moscow Kramnik
 2009 Khanty-Mansiysk (Chess World Cup) Gelfand
 2009 London Carlsen
 2009 Moscow (Russian Championship) Grischuk

2010–2019
 2010 Wijk aan Zee Carlsen
 2010 Linares Topalov
 2010 Astrakhan (Grand Prix 2008–2010) Eljanov
 2010 Mediaș Carlsen
 2010 Dortmund Ponomariov
 2010 Shanghai Shirov
 2010 Bilbao Kramnik
 2010 Nanjing Carlsen
 2010 Moscow Aronian, Karjakin, Mamedyarov
 2010 London Carlsen
 2010 Moscow (Russian Championship) Nepomniachtchi
 2010/11 Reggio Emilia Gashimov
 2011 Wijk aan Zee Nakamura
 2011 Mediaș Carlsen, Karjakin
 2011 Dortmund Kramnik
 2011 Biel Carlsen
 2011 Khanty-Mansiysk (Chess World Cup) Svidler
 2011 São Paulo/Bilbao Carlsen
 2011 Moscow Aronian, Carlsen
 2011 London Kramnik
 2011 Moscow (Russian Championship) Svidler
 2011/12 Reggio Emilia Giri
 2012 Wijk aan Zee Aronian
 2012 Moscow Carlsen
 2012 Dortmund Caruana, Karjakin
 2012 Biel Wang Hao
 2012 London (Grand Prix 2012–2013) Topalov, Gelfand, Mamedyarov
 2012 São Paulo/Bilbao Carlsen
 2012 Bucharest Ivanchuk
 2012 Tashkent (Grand Prix 2012–2013) Karjakin, Wang Hao, Morozevich
 2012 London Carlsen
 2012 Moscow (Russian Championship) Andreikin
 2013 Wijk aan Zee Carlsen
 2013 Baden-Baden Anand
 2013 Zug (Grand Prix 2012–2013) Topalov
 2013 Zurich Caruana
 2013 Paris-St Petersburg Aronian
 2013 Moscow Gelfand
 2013 Thessaloniki (Grand Prix 2012–2013) Domínguez Pérez
 2013 Dortmund Adams
 2013 London (Candidates Tournament) Carlsen
 2013 Beijing (Grand Prix 2012–2013) Mamedyarov
 2013 Stavanger Karjakin
 2013 Tromsø (Chess World Cup) Kramnik
 2013 St Louis Carlsen
 2013 Bilbao Aronian
 2013 Paris (Grand Prix 2012–2013) Caruana, Gelfand
 2013 Bucharest Caruana
 2013 Nizhny Novgorod (Russian Championship) Svidler
 2014 Wijk aan Zee Aronian
 2014 Zurich Carlsen
 2014 Khanty-Mansisyk (Candidates Tournament) Anand
 2014 Shamkir Carlsen
 2014 Stavanger Karjakin
 2014 Biel Vachier-Lagrave
 2014 Dortmund Caruana
 2014 St Louis Caruana
 2014 Baku (Grand Prix 2014–2015) Caruana, Gelfand
 2014 Tashkent (Grand Prix 2014–2015) Andreikin
 2014 Bilbao Anand
 2014 Moscow Grischuk
 2014 London Anand, Kramnik, Giri
 2014 Doha Yu Yangyi
 2014 Kazan (Russian Championship) Lysyj
 2015 Wijk aan Zee Carlsen
 2015 Gibraltar Nakamura
 2015 Baden-Baden Carlsen
 2015 Zurich Nakamura
 2015 St Louis (USA Championship) Nakamura
 2015 Tbilisi (Grand Prix 2014–2015) Tomashevsky
 2015 Shamkir Carlsen
 2015 Khanty-Mansisyk (Grand Prix 2014–2015) Jakovenko, Caruana, Nakamura
 2015 Stavanger (Grand Chess Tour) Topalov
 2015 Dortmund Caruana
 2015 St Louis (Grand Chess Tour) Aronian
 2015 Las Vegas Nakamura
 2015 Baku (Chess World Cup) Karjakin
 2015 Bilbao So
 2015 London (Grand Chess Tour) Carlsen
 2015 Doha Carlsen
 2015 Chita (Russian Championship) Tomashevsky
 2016 Wijk aan Zee Carlsen
 2016 Gibraltar Nakamura
 2016 Moscow (Candidates Tournament) Karjakin
 2016 Stavanger Carlsen
 2016 Shamkir Mamedyarov
 2016 St Louis (USA Championship) Caruana
 2016 Dortmund Vachier-Lagrave
 2016 Bilbao Carlsen
 2016 St Louis (Grand Chess Tour) So
 2016 Moscow Nepomniachtchi
 2016 London (Grand Chess Tour) So
 2017 Wijk aan Zee So
 2017 Gibraltar Nakamura
 2017 Shenzhen Ding Liren
 2017 Sharjah (Grand Prix 2017) Grischuk, Mamedyarov, Vachier-Lagrave
 2017 Shamkir Mamedyarov
 2017 St Louis (USA Championship) So
 2017 Karlsruhe/Baden-Baden Aronian
 2017 Moscow (Grand Prix 2017) Ding Liren
 2017 Stavanger Aronian
 2017 Geneva (Grand Prix 2017) Radjabov
 2017 Dortmund Wojtaszek
 2017 St Louis (Grand Chess Tour) Vachier-Lagrave
 2017 Tbilisi (Chess World Cup) Aronian
 2017 Isle of Man Carlsen
 2017 Palma de Mallorca (Grand Prix 2017) Aronian, Jakovenko
 2017 London (Grand Chess Tour) Caruana
 2018 Wijk aan Zee Carlsen
 2018 Gibraltar Aronian
 2018 Berlin (Candidates Tournament) Caruana
 2018 Karlsruhe/Baden-Baden Caruana
 2018 Shamkir Carlsen
 2018 St Louis (USA Championship) Shankland
 2018 Stavanger Caruana
 2018 Dortmund Nepomniachtchi
 2018 Biel Mamedyarov
 2018 St Louis (Grand Chess Tour) Carlsen, Aronian, Caruana
 2018 Shenzhen Vachier-Lagrave, Ding Liren, Giri
 2018 Isle of Man Wojtaszek
 2018 London (Grand Chess Tour) Nakamura
 2019 Wijk aan Zee Carlsen
 2019 Gibraltar Artemiev
 2019 Shamkir Carlsen
 2019 Shenzhen Giri
 2019 Karlsruhe/Baden-Baden Carlsen
 2019 St Louis (USA Championship) Nakamura
 2019 Moscow (Grand Prix 2019) Nepomniachtchi
 2019 Stavanger Carlsen
 2019 Zagreb (Grand Chess Tour) Carlsen
 2019 Dortmund Dominguez Perez
 2019 Riga (Grand Prix 2019) Mamedyarov
 2019 St Louis (Grand Chess Tour) Ding Liren
 2019 Khanty-Mansiysk (Chess World Cup) Radjabov
 2019 Isle of Man (Grand Swiss) Wang Hao
 2019 Hamburg (Grand Prix 2019) Grischuk
 2019 London (Grand Chess Tour) Ding Liren
 2019 Jerusalem (Grand Prix 2019) Nepomniachtchi

2020–2029
 2020 Wijk aan Zee Caruana
 2020 Gibraltar Paravyan
 2020 Stavanger Carlsen
 2020 Moscow (Russian Championship) Nepomniachtchi
 2021 Wijk aan Zee van Foreest
 2020/21 Yekaterinburg (Candidates Tournament) Nepomniachtchi
 2021 Bucharest (Grand Chess Tour) Mamedyarov
 2021 Sochi (Chess World Cup) Duda
 2021 Ufa (Russian Championship) Vitiugov
 2021 St Louis (Sinquefield Cup) Vachier-Lagrave
 2021 Stavanger Carlsen
 2021 St Louis (USA Championship) So
 2021 Riga (Grand Swiss) Firouzja
 2022 Wijk aan Zee Carlsen
 2022 Berlin (Grand Prix 2022) Nakamura
 2022 Belgrade (Grand Prix 2022) Rapport
 2022 Berlin (Grand Prix 2022) So
 2022 St. Louis (American Cup) Caruana
 2022 Bucharest (Grand Chess Tour) Vachier-Lagrave
 2022 Stavanger Carlsen
 2022 Madrid (Candidates Tournament) Nepomniachtchi
 2022 St. Louis (Sinquefield Cup) Firouzja
 2022 St Louis (USA Championship) Caruana
 2023 Wijk aan Zee Giri

Individual tournaments

Major recurring tournaments

World Cup
Chess World Cup 2005
Chess World Cup 2007
Chess World Cup 2009
Chess World Cup 2011
Chess World Cup 2013
Chess World Cup 2015
Chess World Cup 2017
Chess World Cup 2019
Chess World Cup 2021

See also

List of mini chess tournaments
Chess tournaments
Chess Olympiad
European Individual Chess Championship
EU Individual Open Chess Championship

References

British Chess Magazine (January 1978) – Your Hundred Best Chess Tournaments To 1960 (by Ken Whyld)
British Chess Magazine (August 1979) – Reflections on Montreal (by Raymond Keene)
British Chess Magazine (November 1987) – The 'Super-tournaments' in chess history (by Romelio Milian Gonzalez)

External links
Main world tournaments and matches
Chess tournaments around the world

Strong chess tournaments